Maureen Ward, Countess of Dudley (25 November 1932 – 16 November 2011), was a British actress. Born in Glasgow, Scotland, Lady Dudley was the daughter of James Swanson. As Maureen Swanson, she featured in British pictures during the 1950s and retired from acting in 1961, following her marriage to Viscount Ednam.

Early life and career
Maureen Swanson was born in Glasgow on 25 November 1932. After her parents emigrated to South Africa, she became a ward of Lady Phyllis Griffith-Boscawen. Swanson initially trained as a classical ballerina at the Sadler's Wells Ballet School, before moving into musical theatre and film.

Swanson had a role in Moulin Rouge (1952), then a larger part in Valley of Song (1953). She had a strong support role in MGM's Knights of the Round Table (1953), and was the female lead in Hammer's film noir Third Party Risk (1954). Swanson was also in episodes of The Vise, and had a supporting part in Orders Are Orders (1954).

Rank Organisation
Swanson was signed to a long-term contract by the Rank Organisation, who put her in support roles in A Town Like Alice (1956) and Jacqueline (1956). She was Norman Wisdom's leading lady in Up in the World (1956), and Dirk Bogarde's leading lady in The Spanish Gardener (1956).

Swanson was the female lead in Robbery Under Arms (1957). She then appeared on television in The Happiest Millionaire and a version of The Importance of Being Earnest. In October 1956, John Davis, managing director of Rank, announced her as one of the actors under contract that Davis thought would become an international star.

Marriage and children
She married Viscount Ednam on 24 August 1961 at Amersham registry office. She was his second wife. Initially titled Viscountess Ednam, she was styled as the Countess of Dudley on 26 December 1969, following her husband's succession to the earldom.

They had seven children: 
 Hon. William Ward (born and died stillborn 21 October 1961)
 Lady Susanna Louise Ward (born 23 May 1963), unmarried and without issue
 Lady Melissa Patricia Eileen Ward (born 18 July 1964), married in 1991 to Simon Puxley; has daughter (India Ward Puxley; born 1991)
 Lady Victoria Larissa Cecilia Ward (born 28 May 1966), unmarried and has son (George  Ward-Carstairs; born 18-12-96)
 Lady Amelia Maureen Erica Ward (born 5 September 1967), unmarried and without issue
 Lady Cressida Emma Sophia Ward (born 7 January 1970), married on 29 June 1996 to Oliver Preston, without issue, divorced 1998. She married, secondly, in a civil service in July 2011 in London, and on 1 October 2011 in Sicily in a Roman Catholic wedding, to Dr. Ludovic Toro; Ward has a daughter from a prior relationship (Lily Rose Ward Davis; born 2 November 2004)
 Hon. Leander Grenville Dudley Ward (born 31 October 1971), married British journalist Laura Sevier on 23 July 2011

Later life
As the Countess of Dudley, she managed the couple's homes in Cottesmore Gardens, Kensington, London and Devon. She also served as a lady in waiting to Princess Michael of Kent.

The Countess died on 16 November 2011 and was laid to rest in the private burial ground of the Earls of Dudley at the rear of the parish church at Himley.

Filmography
 Moulin Rouge (1952) .... Denise de Frontiac
 Valley of Song (1953) .... Olwen Davies
 Knights of the Round Table (1953) .... Elaine
 One Just Man (1954)
 Third Party Risk (1954) .... Marina
 Orders Are Orders (1954) .... Joanne Delamere
 Douglas Fairbanks, Jr., Presents (1954, Episode: "Rehearsal") .... Marguerite
 The Vise (1954–1955, TV Series) .... Susan, Craig's daughter / Maria / Maria / Susan Allerton
 Three Cornered Fate (1955) .... Maria
 The Bob Hope Show (1956, Episode: "Douglas Fairbanks Jr., Cornel Wilde, Elsa Martinelli, Jean Wallace") .... Herself
 A Town Like Alice (1956) .... Ellen
 Jacqueline (1956) .... Maggie
 Up in the World (1956) .... Jeannie Andrews
 The Spanish Gardener (1956) .... Maria
 Robbery Under Arms (1957) .... Kate Morrison Mullockson
 The Edgar Wallace Mystery Theatre (1960, Episode: "The Malpas Mystery") .... Audrey Bedford
 No Hiding Place (1961, Episode: "A Warrant for Joe Roberts") .... Ann Evans (final appearance)

Theatre
 The Happiest Millionaire
 Who's Your Father? by Dennis Cannan, opposite Donald Sinden, at the Cambridge Theatre

Libel case
In a 1989 libel case, Lady Dudley testified that she had an affair in the early 1950s with Stephen Ward, the osteopath and artist who was one of the central figures in the 1963 Profumo affair. They became friends when he was commissioned to draw her portrait in 1953 – 10 years before the Profumo scandal. From the 1989 court case, Lady Dudley won "substantial" damages from the publishers of Honeytrap: the Secret Worlds of Stephen Ward by Anthony Summer and Stephen Dorril, in which the authors suggested that she had been one of the "popsies" whom Ward had procured for his influential friends. In 2002, the Countess of Dudley again accepted substantial libel damages from the publishers of Christine Keeler: The Truth At Last, Keeler's own account of the events surrounding her notorious affair with the former war minister John Profumo, in which she referred to Lady Dudley as having been "one of Stephen's girls".

References

External links
 
 The Peerage profile

1932 births
2011 deaths
Dudley
Actresses from Glasgow
Scottish film actresses
Scottish television actresses
Maureen